Robert James Hornery (28 May 1931 – 26 May 2015) was an Australian actor. He won both the Helpmann Awards and the Equity Awards lifetime achievement award, with a career spanning 60 years, in both Britain and Australia. He was well known for his ability to ad lib.

Early life and education
Robert Hornery was born on 28 May 1931, in Randwick, New South Wales, to Edward Hornery, a sales rep, and his wife, Veronica (née Gallen). He appeared in plays at the local Catholic secondary school, Marcellin College. Upon leaving school, he worked as a booking clerk for Butler Airways. During this period, he also performed in revues with amateur companies.

Career

=theatre
Hornery started his career in  theatre in 1949, and made his professional debut in 1953, when he played Eustace Smell, the town crier and sidekick, in a production of Jack and the Beanstalk, at Sydney's Capitol Theatre. As well as other stage roles, he appeared in the stage production of The Importance of Being Earnest as the Rev. Canon Chasuble. This ran from 1988 to 1992 and was televised by the ABC. He was particularly associated with the Melbourne Theatre Company, and with roles ranging from comic to the dramatic, including The Elocution of Benjamin Franklin and A Funny Thing Happened on the Way to the Forum.

screen
He also appeared in  Australian film and television production including Thunderstone and guested in Neighbours as the father of Karl Kennedy, Tom Kennedy. He appeared in the television series Doctor Who and Sapphire and Steel. His film roles included Mad Max Beyond Thunderdome and Crackerjack.

Personal life and death 
In 1973, Hornery married Patricia Allen. They had a daughter, Jane. He died on 26 May 2015 after a long cancer illness, two days before his 84th birthday. He was survived by his wife, daughter and stepson, Max Allen.

Filmography

Film roles
Phoelix (1980) - Queen Nefertiti
Britannia Hospital (1982) - BBC Cameraman
Stanley: Every Home Should Have One (1984) - Dr Chambers
Mad Max Beyond Thunderdome (1985) - Waterseller
Ground Zero (1987) - Meteorologist
Road to Nhill (1997) - Alvin
Crackerjack (2002) - Ron

References

External links
 Bob Hornery - Stage acting credits
 "The Importance of Being Earnest" — (information and photos):
http://www.ausstage.edu.au/indexdrilldown.jsp?xcid=59&f_event_id=1549
http://www.ausstage.edu.au/indexdrilldown.jsp?xcid=59&f_event_id=12571
http://www.ausstage.edu.au/indexdrilldown.jsp?xcid=59&f_event_id=12850
http://www.ausstage.edu.au/indexdrilldown.jsp?xcid=59&f_event_id=14306
http://www.ausstage.edu.au/indexdrilldown.jsp?xcid=59&f_event_id=13283
http://www.imdb.com/title/tt0104490/
http://nla.gov.au/nla.pic-an23386505
http://nla.gov.au/nla.pic-an23386438
 

1931 births
2015 deaths
Australian male stage actors
Australian male television actors
Helpmann Award winners